Statistics of Swiss Super League in the 1913–14 season.

East

Table

Central

Table

West

Table

Final

Table

Results 

|colspan="3" style="background-color:#D0D0D0" align=center|26 April 1914

|-
|colspan="3" style="background-color:#D0D0D0" align=center|3 May 1914

|-
|colspan="3" style="background-color:#D0D0D0" align=center|10 May 1914

|}

FC Aarau won the championship.

Sources 
 Switzerland 1913-14 at RSSSF

Seasons in Swiss football
Swiss Football League seasons
1913–14 in Swiss football
Swiss